Kal Duzakh-e Yek (also Romanized as Kal Dūzakh-e Yek; also known as Kal Dūzakh) is a village in Howmeh-ye Sharqi Rural District, in the Central District of Izeh County, Khuzestan Province, Iran. At the 2006 census, its population was 1,496, in 256 families.

References 

Populated places in Izeh County